The Men's time trial B road cycling event at the 2020 Summer Paralympics took place on 31 August 2021, at the Fuji Speedway in Tokyo. 11 riders (and pilots) competed in the event.

The B classification is for cyclists with visual impairment. Sighted guides act as pilots in these events, which take place on tandem bikes.

Results
The event took place on 31 August 2021, at 13:30:

References

Men's road time trial B